The World Pantheist Movement (WPM) is an international organization which promotes naturalistic pantheism, a philosophy which asserts that spirituality should be centered on nature. Paul Harrison is their founder and president.

External appearance 
Its symbol is the spiral as seen in the curves of the nautilus shell which embodies the Fibonacci series and the golden ratio.

Beliefs and practice 
The WPM uses the term “divine” rather than “god” and states that the universe as a whole is one with divinity. It has developed a pantheist credo as a guide (not indispensable set of rules for the members) and sees the universe as an everlasting, diverse and self-organized unit. All human beings are part of it and should therefore preserve the nature. The main focus is based on scientific pantheism and a naturalistic approach with reverence to the physical universe, oriented towards environmentalism with respect for human and animal rights.

References

External links
 

Pantheist organizations
Organizations established in 1999
International religious organizations